Thomas or Tom Conley may refer to:

 Tom Conley (American football), American football coach and player, basketball coach
 Tom Conley (philologist) (born 1943), American philologist

See also
 
 Earl Thomas Conley (1941–2019), country music singer